National Westminster Bank Football Club is a football club based in Beckenham, England. They are currently members of the Amateur Football Combination.

History
In 1970, the club was formed as a result of the merger between National Provincial Bank and Westminster Bank to form NatWest. Both respective banks had football clubs that played in the Southern Amateur League. The club competed in the Southern Amateur League from 1970 to 2002, leaving to join the London Financial Football Association. In 1987, National Westminster Bank entered the FA Vase for the only time in their history. The club later joined the Amateur Football Combination.

Ground
Upon the club's formation, the club played at Turle Road in Norbury until 1999. In 1999, National Westminster Bank moved to Beckenham, playing at the Royal Bank of Scotland Sports Ground, before moving to Club Langley in the suburb of Eden Park.

Records
Best FA Vase performance: Extra preliminary round, 1987–88

References

External links

NatWest Group
Southern Amateur Football League
Amateur Football Combination
1970 establishments in England
Sport in the London Borough of Croydon
Sport in the London Borough of Bromley
Association football clubs established in 1970
Football clubs in England
Financial services association football clubs in England
Amateur association football teams
Football clubs in London